The 2002 Liga Sudamericana de Básquetbol, or 2002 FIBA South American League, was the seventh edition of the top-tier tournament for basketball teams from South America. The tournament began on 20 February 2001 and finished on 1 May 2002. Argentine team Libertad won their first title, defeating Vasco da Gama in the Grand Finals.

Format
Teams were split into four groups of four teams each, and played each other in a round-robin format. The top two teams from each group advanced to the final stage, a best-of-three direct playoff elimination in the quarterfinals and the semifinals, and a best-of-five elimination series in the Grand Finals, where the champion was decided.

Teams

Group stage

Group A

Group B

Group C

Group D

Final stage

Quarterfinals

Game 1

Game 2

Game 3

Semifinals

Game 1

Game 2

Game 3

Grand Finals

Finals rosters
Libertad Sunchales: , Mariano Cerutti , Esteban Pérez, Jorge Benítez, Román González - Sebastián Acosta. Coach: Daniel Rodríguez

Vasco da Gama: , Jamison Costa, Rogério Klafke, Jose Mingão, Sandro Varejão - Chuí. Coach: Hélio Rubens 

Season MVP: Mariano Cerutti

References

Liga Sudamericana
2002